Tuscarora, sometimes called , was the Iroquoian language of the Tuscarora people, spoken in southern Ontario, Canada, North Carolina and northwestern New York around Niagara Falls, in the United States, before becoming extinct in late 2020.  The historic homeland of the Tuscarora was in eastern North Carolina, in and around the Goldsboro, Kinston, and Smithfield areas.

The name Tuscarora means "hemp people," after the Indian hemp or milkweed, which they use in many aspects of their society.  refers to the long shirt worn as part of the men's regalia, and so the name literally means "long shirt people."

Tuscarora is recently extinct, the last fluent first language speaker having died in 2020. In the mid-1970s, 50 people spoke it on the Tuscarora Reservation (Lewiston, New York) and the Six Nations of the Grand River First Nation (near Brantford, Ontario). The Tuscarora School in Lewiston has striven to keep Tuscarora alive as a heritage language by teaching children from pre-kindergarten to sixth grade. 

The language can appear complex to those unfamiliar with it more in terms of its grammar than its sound system. Many ideas can be expressed in a single word.  Most words involve several components that must be considered. The language is written using mostly symbols from the Roman alphabet, with some variations, additions, and diacritics.

Phonology

Vowels

Tuscarora has four oral vowels, one nasal vowel, and one diphthong.  The vowels can be either short or long, which makes a total of eight oral vowels, and two nasal vowels, . Nasal vowels are indicated with an ogonek, long vowels with either a following colon  or an interpunct , and stressed vowels are marked with an acute accent . The pronunciation of unstressed short vowels varies between dialects, as shown in the following tables:

Thus in the official writing system of Tuscarora, the vowels are a e í u ę. The marginal phonemes ą and o occur in loanwords.

Consonants
The Tuscarora language has ten symbols representing consonants, including three stops (and ), three fricatives (and ), a nasal, a rhotic, and two glides ( and ).  These last four can be grouped together under the category of resonants. (Mithun Williams, 1976)  The range of sounds, though, is more extensive, with palatalization, aspiration, and other variants of the sounds, that usually come when two sounds are set next to each other.

The phonemic consonant cluster  is realized as a postalveolar fricative . The marginal phonemes l and m occur in loanwords.

Stops
Each sound has specific changes that take place when situated in certain positions. These are among the phonetic (automatic) rules listed below. In the written system, however, only t, k, and ′ are used.   is aspirated when it directly precedes another .

Fricatives and affricates
Both are pronounced , but in some situations,  is pronounced .  is generally .

Resonants
A rule (below) specifies pre-aspiration under certain circumstances. The resonants can also become voiceless fricatives (as specified below). A voiceless  is described as "a silent movement of the tongue accompanied by an audible escape of breath through the nose."

Automatic rules
V = a vowel
C = a consonant
R = a resonant
# = the beginning or end of a word
Ø = sound is dropped

Used here is a type of linguistic notation.

Morphology

Verbs
The basic construction of a verb consists of
prepronominal prefixes
pronominal prefixes
the verb base
aspect suffixes
in that order.  All verbs contain at least a pronominal prefix and a verb base.

Prepronominal prefixes
These are the very first prefixes in a verb.  Prepronominal prefixes can indicate
tense
direction
location
In addition, these can mark such distinctions as dualic, contrastive, partitive, and iterative.  According to Marianne Mithun Williams, it is possible to find some semantic similarities from the functions of prepronominal prefixes, but not such that each morpheme is completely explained in this way.

Pronominal prefixes
As it sounds, pronominal prefixes identify pronouns with regards to the verb, including person, number, and gender.  Since all verbs must have at least a subject, the pronominal prefixes identify the subject, and if the verb is transitive, these prefixes also identify the object.  For example:

Tuscarora word: 
Translation: He is talking.
Breakdown: masculine + 'talk' + serial
The  is the masculine pronominal prefix, indicating that a male person is the subject of the sentence.

On account of various changes in the evolution of the language, not all of the possible combinations of distinctions in person, number, and gender are made, and some pronominal prefixes or combinations thereof can represent several acceptable meanings.

Verb base
The verb base is, generally, exactly what it sounds like: it is the barest form of the verb.  This is a verb stem that consists solely of one verb root.

Verb stems can be made of more than just a verb root.  More complex stems are formed by adding modifiers.  Roots might be combined with many different kinds of morphemes to create complicated stems.  Possibilities include reflexive, inchoative, reversive, intensifier, and distributive morphemes, instrumental, causative, or dative case markers, and also incorporated noun stems.  The base may be further complicated by ambulative or purposive morphemes.

Aspect suffixes
Aspect suffixes are temporal indicators, and are used with all indicative verbs.  "Aspect" is with respect to duration or frequency; "tense" is with respect to the point in time at which the verb's action takes place.  Three different aspects can be distinguished, and each distinguished aspect can be furthermore inflected for three different tenses.  These are, respectively, punctual, serial, or perfective, and past, future, or indefinite.

Nouns
Nouns, like verbs, are composed of several parts.  These are, in this order:
the pronominal prefix
the noun stem
the nominal suffix

Nouns can be divided two ways, formally and functionally, and four ways, into formal nouns, other functional nouns, possessive constructions, and attributive suffixes.

Formal nouns

Pronominal prefix and noun gender

The pronominal prefix is very much like that in verbs.  It refers to who or what is being identified.  The prefixes vary according to the gender, number, and "humanness" of the noun.  Genders include:
neuter
masculine singular
feminine-indefinite human singular
indefinite human dual
indefinite human plural
The prefixes are:
neuter
ò-
à:w-
masculine singular
ra-
r-
feminine-indefinite human singular
e-
ę́-
indefinite human dual nouns
neye-
indefinite human plural nouns
kaye-

Noun stem
Most stems are simple noun roots that are morphologically unanalyzable.  These can be referred to as "simplex stems."  More complex stems can be derived from verbs this is commonly done as: 
(verb stem) + (nominalizing morpheme).
The process can be repeated multiple times, making more complex stems, but it is rarely the case that it is repeated too many times.

Nominal suffix
Most nouns end in the morpheme -eh.  Some end in -aʔ, -ęʔ, or -ʔ.

Other nominals

Other functional nominals

In addition to the formal nouns mentioned above, clauses, verbs, and unanalyzable particles can also be classified as nominals.  Clausal nominals are such things as sentential subjects and compliments.  Verbal nominals usually describe their referents.

Unanalyzable particles arise from three main sources which overlap somewhat.
onomatopoeia
onomatopoeia from other languages
other languages
verbal descriptions of referents
Onomatopoeia, from Tuscarora or other languages, is less common than other words from other languages or verbal descriptions that turned to nominals.  In many cases a pronominal prefix has dropped off, so that only the minimal stem remains.

Possessive constructions
Ownership is divided into alienable and inalienable possession, each of which type has its own construction.  An example of inalienable possession would be someone's body part—this cannot be disputed.  An example of alienable possession would be a piece of paper held by someone.

Attributive suffixes
Attributive suffixes come in many forms:
adjectival
locative
characterizer
populative
customary
intensifier
decessive
diminutives
augmentives

A diminutive indicates something smaller; an augmentive makes something bigger.  A simple example would be a diminutive suffix added to the word "cat" to form a word meaning "small cat."  A more abstract example would be the diminutive of "trumpet" forming "pipe."  Both diminutives and augmentives have suffixes that indicate both smallness and plurality.  A (certain) diminutive can be added to any functional nominal.  Augmentives usually combine with other morphemes, forming more specific stems.

Attributive suffixes can be added to any word that functions as a nominal, even if it is a verb or particle.

Syntax

Word order

The basic word order in Tuscarora is SVO (subject–verb–object), but this can vary somewhat and still form grammatical sentences, depending on who the agents and patients are. For example:
If two nouns of the same relative "status" are together in a sentence, the SVO word order is followed.  Such is the case, for example, in a noun-predicate-noun sentence in which both nouns are third person zoic (non-human) singular.  If one is of a "superior" status, it can be indicated by a pronominal prefix, such as hra, and as such SVO, VSO, and OSV are all grammatically correct.  The example given in Grammar Tuscarora is:
SVO

VSO

OSV

In all cases, the translation is "William saw a dog."  Mithun writes:
"[I]t is necessary but not sufficient to consider the syntactic case roles of major constituents.  In fact, the order of sentence elements is describable in terms of functional deviation from a syntactically defined basic order." (Emphasis added.)

A sentence that is ambiguous on basis of its containing too many ambiguous arguments is:

Case

Tuscarora appears to be a nominative-accusative language.
Tuscarora has a case system in which syntactic case is indicated in the verb.  The main verb of the sentence can indicate, for example, "aorist+1st-person+objective+human+'transitive-verb'+punctual+dative."  (In this case, a sentence could be a single word long, as below in Noun Incorporation.) Objective and dative are indicated by morphemes.

Noun incorporation

Tuscarora definitely incorporates nouns into verbs, as is evident from many examples on this page.  This is typical of a polysynthetic language.  In Tuscarora, one long verb can be an entire sentence, including subject and object.  In fact, theoretically any number of arguments could be incorporated into a verb.  It is done by raising nominals realized as noun stems.  Datives are not incorporated.

Examples are as follows:

Vocabulary examples
(From Grammar Tuscarora by Marianne Mithun Williams.)

'hello'

'high'

'I think'

'blood'

'bread'

Relations
Tuscarora is a Northern Iroquoian language.  This branch of Iroquois includes Mohawk, Oneida, Onondaga, Seneca, and Cayuga along with Tuscarora and its historic neighbor, Nottoway.   

Wallace Chafe posits that a larger language, reconstructed as Proto-Northern-Iroquois, broke off into Proto-Tuscarora-Cayuga, and then broke off onto its own, having no further contact with Cayuga or any of the others. 

However, Lounsbury (1961:17) classed Tuscarora, along with Laurentian, Huron-Wyandot, and Cherokee as the "peripheral" Iroquoian languages—in distinction to the five "inner languages" of the Iroquois proper.  Blair Rudes, who did extensive scholarship on Tuscarora and wrote a Tuscarora dictionary, concurred with Lounsbury, adding Nottoway and Susquehannock (which Lounsbury ignored in his comparisons) to the list of "peripheral" Iroquoian languages.

Bibliography
Rudes, Blair A. (1999). Tuscarora-English / English-Tuscarora Dictionary. Toronto, Ontario, Canada: University of Toronto Press.
Rudes, Blair A., and Dorothy Crouse (1987). The Tuscarora Legacy of J. N. B. Hewitt: Materials for the Study of Tuscarora Language and Culture. Canadian Museum of Civilization, Mercury Series, Canadian Ethnology Service Paper No. 108.
Williams, Marianne Mithun (1976). A Grammar of Tuscarora.  Garland studies in American Indian Linguistics.

See also
Tuscarora (tribe)

References

External links
Tuscarora Language at the Tuscarora School
Language Geek: Tuscarora
Tuscarora Language Learning Yahoo! Group
Tuscarora Language Audio Clips, and list of collections

+
Extinct languages of North America
First Nations languages in Canada
Indigenous languages of the North American eastern woodlands
Indigenous languages of the North American Southeast
Languages of the United States
Languages of New York (state)
Languages of North Carolina
Northern Iroquoian languages